Shajahan Khan (Bengali: শাজাহান খান) is a Bangladeshi politician, 7-times elected member of Jatiya Sangsad from Madaripur-2 constituency. He served as the Minister of Shipping of Bangladesh from 2009 to 2019. He was announced as a presidium member of Awami League at 2019.

Shajahan Khan is a freedom fighter, he fought in 1971 Liberation War as a member of Mukti Bahini. He is the Chairman of the Parliamentary Standing Committee of Ministry of Liberation War Affairs on the 11th National Parliament of Bangladesh.

Early life
Khan was born on 1 January 1952 to Asmat Ali Khan, an MP, politician and educationist, and Tajan Nesa Begum. He passed the S.S.C examination from United Islamia High School, Madaripur in 1966 and H.S.C from Madaripur Nazimuddin College in 1968. He obtained his bachelor's from Govt. Nazimuddin College.

Career 
Khan joined politics in 1964. He was elected as the secretary of Chhatra League in Madaripur subdivision. Later he was elected as the secretary general (1966–67) and vice-president (1968–69) of Govt. Nazimuddin College. He was a Mukti Bahini soldier, of Mujib Bahini section. He received military-training in Dehradun, India.

Khan is a presidium member of Bangladesh Awami League, and the current executive president of Bangladesh Road Transport Workers Federation.

Khan is currently a 7 times elected MP. He was first elected in The National Parliament in 1986, as the MP of Madaripur-2 constituency. Later in 1991, 1996, 2001, 2008, 2014 and 2018 he has been elected as an MP from the same seat as the nominee of Bangladesh Awami League.

On 31 July 2009, Khan was appointed as Minister of Shipping. In November 2013, he was appointed in the Interim government as the Minister of Liberation War Affairs. Following the election of 2014, he left that ministry and took up the responsibility of the Ministry of Shipping and held the office until January 2019.

Khan is currently also serving as the Chairman of the stannding committee of Ministry of Liberation War Affairs.

Controversy 

On 23 August 2011, transport workers loyal to Khan snatched newspapers from hawkers and transport vehicles because the newspapers criticized the role Khan played in granting driving licenses. He has been criticised for defending drivers violating traffic laws. As the Minister of Shipping, he defended chief engineer of the Department of Shipping AKM Fakhrul Islam and protected him from departmental action. Islam was arrested on 11 August 2017 by Bangladesh Anti-Corruption Commission with half a million taka in bribe. He has supported CBA leaders at Bangladesh Bank worrying officers at the bank. He was criticised over the recruitment at Chittagong port by government MP Moin Uddin Khan Badal and opposition party MP Ziauddin Ahmed Bablu.

On 29 July 2018, Khan was criticized for commenting lightheartedly with a smile, about a road accident which led to the death of two students. Following his remark, countrywide protests and road blockades were held by the students  demanding a sincere apology. He later apologised for his remarks.

Personal life
Khan has been married to Syeda Rokeya Begum, daughter of Ekushey Padak winning journalist Syed Golam Kibria. The couple has two sons and one daughter. Eldest of them Ashib Khan is an Advocate and a central committee member of Awami Jubo League. His only Daughter Oaishe Khan is married to Tangail-2 MP Tanvir Hasan Soto Monir.

References

External links
Shajahan Khan on Facebook
Ashib Khan on Facebook

Living people
1952 births
People from Madaripur District
Awami League politicians
Shipping ministers of Bangladesh
Liberation War Affairs ministers of Bangladesh
8th Jatiya Sangsad members
9th Jatiya Sangsad members
10th Jatiya Sangsad members
11th Jatiya Sangsad members
3rd Jatiya Sangsad members
7th Jatiya Sangsad members
5th Jatiya Sangsad members